= Literator =

Literator may refer to several things:

- A literary person, a Man of Letters
- A writer, one who writes professionally, sometimes the original French term litterateur is used
- Literator (company), a formative assessment tool for teachers to track their students' reading performance through conferring
